Pedapalli district is a district located in the northern region of the Indian state of Telangana. Its administrative headquarters is at Peddapalli and Commissionerate is at Ramagundam. The district shares boundaries with Mancherial, Karimnagar, Jagtial and Jayashankar Bhupalpally districts. This district covers Ramagundam city which is situated in the Godavari valley coalfields and has one of the India's largest thermal power stations in south region under NTPC. Mostly industries are connected with Godavarikhani - NTPC - Ramagundam.

Geography 

Administration 

There are 14 mandals are in the district.

Villages
There are 215 revenue villages in the district.

 Abbapur
 Abbapuram
 Adavisomanpalle
 Adavisrirampur
 Adial
 Adivarampeta
 Adrial
 Akena palli
 Akkepalle
 Allur
 Ammagaripalle
 Andugulapalli
 Angulur
 Anthergoam
 Appannapet
 Arenda
 Bandampalli
 Banjerupally
 Basanth nagar
 Begumpet
 Bestapally
 Bhatpalle
 Bhatpally
 Bhitpalli
 Bhojannapet
 Bhoopathipuram
 Bitpalle (k)
 Bittupally
 Bommareddypalli
 Bompalli
 Botlavanaparthy
 Brahmanpalli
 Budhavarampeta
 Burahanmayapet
 Chamanpalle
 Chandapalli
 Cheekurai
 Cheemalapeta
 Chillapally
 Chinna Bonkur
 Chinna Kalvala
 Chinna Komera
 Dariyapur
 Dharmaram
 Dongathurthy
 Donthulapally
 Doolikatta
 Dubbapally
 Dubbapet
 Edulapuram
 Eklaspur
 Eklaspur
 Eligaid
 Elkalpalle
 Esalatakkalapally
 Gaddalapalle
 Gajulapally
 Gangaram
 Garrepalle
 Gattepalle
 Gattusingaram
 Goilwada
 Gollapalle
 Gollapally
 Gopalpur
 Gopalraopet
 Gowreddipet
 Gudem
 Gudipalle
 Gumnoor
 Gumpula
 Gundaram
 Gundlapalli
 Gunjapadu
 Gurrampalli
 Haripur
 Haripuram
 Indurthi
 Ippalapalle
 Isala Tekkalla Palle
 Ithrajpalle
 Jafarkhanpet
 Jallaram
 Jallipalle
 Jangoam
 Jayyarm
 Jeelakunta
 Jillelapalli
 Julapalle
 Kachapur
 Kadambapur
 Kakarlapally
 Kalwacherla
 Kamanpur
 Kammarikhanpeta
 Kanagarthy
 Kannala
 Kanukula
 Kasipet
 Kasulapally
 Katnepalle
 Khanampalle
 Khanapur
 Khansabpet
 Khilavanaparthy
 Kistampet
 Kodurupaka
 Kolanur / Kolanoor
 Kothapalle
 Kothapally
 Kothur
 Kuchirajpalle
 Kukkalagudur
 Kummarikunta
 Kunaram
 Kundanpalle
 Ladnapoor
 Lakkapur
 Lakkaram
 Lalapalli
 Lankakesaram
 Laxmipur
 Lingala
 Lingapur
 Lokapet
 Machupeta
 Madaka
 Maddiriyala
 Maidipalle
 Malkapur
 Mallapur
 Mallaram
 Mallepalle
 Mallial
 Mallialpalli
 Mancharami
 Mangapet
 Manthani
 Maredpaka
 Maredugonda
 Maredupalle
 Medipalle
 Mirzampet
 Miyapur
 Mogalpahad (n.e)
 Motlapalle
 Mulasala
 Mulkalapalle
 Munjampalle
 Muppirithota
 Murmoor
 Mustial
 Mutharam
 Myadaram
 Mydambanda
 Nadimipally
 Nagaram
 Nagepally
 Nagulapalli
 Namsanipalle
 Narsapoor
 Narsimhulapalli
 Narsingapur
 Neerukulla
 Nellipalli
 Nimmanapalle
 Nittur
 Odedu
 Odela
 Paidichinthala palle
 Palakurthy
 Palilthem
 Palthem
 Pandilla
 Pandulapalle
 Pandulapally
 Pannur
 Paratpalle
 Parthipaka
 Parupalle
 Pathipaka
 Pathkapalle
 Pedda Bonkur
 Pedda Kalvala
 Pedda Komera
 Peddampet
 Peddapalle (urban)
 Peddapur
 Pegadapalle
 Penchikalpet
 Perapalle
 Poosala
 Potharam
 Potiyala
 Putnoor
 Puttapaka
 Rachepalle
 Raghavapur
 Ragineedu
 Ragnapoor
 Raidandi
 Rajapur
 Ramagundam (U)
 Ramaiah palli
 Ramaraopally
 Rampalle
 Ranapur
 Rangaiahpalli
 Rangampalle
 Rangapur
 Rathupalle
 Ratnapur
 Rebbaldevipalle
 Regadimaddikunta
 Rompikunta
 Roopnarayanpet
 Ryakaldevpalli
 Sabitham
 Sanagonda
 Sarnepalle
 Sarvaram
 Sayampeta
 Seethampeta
 Shastrulapally
 Shatharajpalle
 Shivapalli
 Shukravarampalli
 Siripuram
 Somanapalle
 Srirampur
 Suddala
 Sukravarampeta
 Sultanabad
 Sulthanpoor
 Sundilla
 Suraiahpally
 Swarnapalle
 Swarnapally
 Telukunta
 Tharupalle
 Thoagarrai
 Thotagopaiahpally
 Turkalamaddi Kunta
 Undeda
 Upparapalli
 Upparla Kesaram
 Uppatla
 Velgalapahad
 Vemnoor
 Vempad
 Venkatapur
 Venkatraopalli
 Vennampalle
 Vilochavaram
 Wadkapur
 Yellamapalle
 Yerraguntapalli

Demographics 
 Census of India, the district has a population of 791,836. Scheduled Castes and Scheduled Tribes make up 19.44% and 1.89% of the population respectively.

According to the census, 92.10% of the population speaks Telugu and 5.39% Urdu as their first language.

Administrative divisions 

 Revenue Divisions - 2 (Peddapalli and Manthani)
Municipal Corporation - 1 (Ramagundam)
Municipalities - 3 (Peddapalli, Manthani and Sultanabad)
 Revenue Villages - 215
 Gram Panchayats - 208

Transport

ROAD 
Peddapalli is Well Connected with the Road Transportation. This District has a DistricHeadquarters. There are two State are SH-1 and S. This District has No National Highways. This District has two Telangana State Road Transport Corporation Bus Depot's named Godavarikhani (GDK) and Manthani (MNTY).

RAIL 

Peddapalli District is Well Connected with Rail Transportation which is Operated by Secunderabad Railway Division in South Central Railway Zone. This District has a Main Railway Line Which Connects New Delhi(NDLS) - Chennai Central(MAS) and Peddapalli(PDPL) - Nizamabad (NZB).

List of Railway Stations in Peddapalli District with Railway Station Codes:

AIR 
Airport Code IATA: RMD, ICAO: VORG

Peddapalli District has an Airport with 1,300m runway. Which is located at Kesoram Cement Factory, BasanthNagar, Ramagundam. It is Owned by the Birla Family and it is operated by the Airports Authority of India. But After the closure of Vayudoot it has not been regular use. Now it is an unusual Airport. The Government of Telangana is planning to develop this airport as a part of third airport in the state of Telangana by 2022 and it serves for four districts i.e. Peddapalli, Mancherial, Karimnagar and Jagtial.

See also 
Peddapalle (Lok Sabha constituency)
Peddapalle (Assembly constituency)
Ramagundam (Assembly constituency)
Manthani (Assembly constituency)
List of districts in Telangana
Ramagiri Fort
NTPC Ramagundam
Sripada Yellampalli project

References

External links 

 
Districts of Telangana